Bagwyllydiart is a hamlet in Herefordshire, England  south west of Hereford near the Welsh border. It lies between the villages of Kentchurch, Orcop, and Garway.

References

External links

Hamlets in Herefordshire